The Palić Open was a tournament for professional female tennis players played on outdoor clay courts. The event was classified as a $10,000 ITF Women's Circuit tournament and was held in Palić, Serbia, from 2004 to 2016. In 2008, the tournament was upgraded to $50,000 level, however it remained a $10,000 tournament afterwards.

Past finals

Singles

Doubles

External links 
 ITF search

Palić
ITF Women's World Tennis Tour
Clay court tennis tournaments
Tennis tournaments in Serbia
Recurring sporting events established in 2004
Recurring sporting events disestablished in 2016
Defunct sports competitions in Serbia